Aftab (also Romanized as Āftāb) is a village in Aftab Rural District, Aftab District, Tehran County, Tehran Province, Iran. As measured in the 2006 census, its population was 116, comprising 28 families.

References 

Populated places in Tehran County